PLP may refer to:

Science and technology
 Papain-like protease, a family of cysteine protease enzymes
 Phantom limb pain, pain felt as from a missing limb
 Proteolipid protein 1 or proteolipid protein 2, associated with Pelizaeus-Merzbacher disease
 Pyridoxal phosphate, a coenzyme, the active form of vitamin B6

Computing
 Packet Layer Protocol, a network layer protocol
 PL/P, a programming language
 Physical Layer Pipe (PLPs), specified in the DVB-T2 and ATSC 3.0 broadcasting standards

Politics
 Parliamentary Labour Party, a group of British Labour MPs
 Party for Freedom and Progress, a Belgian liberal political party (1961–1992)
 People's Life Party, a Japanese political party
 Pragati Legislature Party, a 1970s political party in Orissa, India
 Progressive Labour Party (disambiguation), several political parties
 Progressive Liberal Party, a Bahamian political party

Other uses
 Premier League Productions
 PLP Architecture, a London, UK firm
 Pamantasan ng Lungsod ng Pasig, a university in the Philippines
 Peace Love & Pitbulls, a Swedish industrial rock band
 Phoenix Living Poets, Chatto & Windus 1960-1983 books
 Prosopographisches Lexikon der Palaiologenzeit, a German-language late Byzantine Empire dictionary